Cour Saint-Émilion is a station on Line 14 of the Paris Métro. Opened in 1998, it is named after the wine of Saint-Émilion because it was built at the old railway station of Bercy where wine from Southern France arrived in Paris.

The entrance of the station opens onto Bercy Village, which is a commercial area of Paris that replaced the old wine warehouses of Bercy. This is an area specialising in good food. In the vicinity of the station, it is also possible to visit the Musée des Arts Forains (The Fairground Art Museum).

Station layout

Gallery

References
Roland, Gérard (2003). Stations de métro. D’Abbesses à Wagram. Éditions Bonneton.

Accessible Paris Métro stations
Paris Métro stations in the 12th arrondissement of Paris
Railway stations in France opened in 1998